Lantana is a 2001 Australian drama film, directed by Ray Lawrence and starring Anthony LaPaglia, Kerry Armstrong, Geoffrey Rush and Barbara Hershey. It is based on the play Speaking In Tongues by Andrew Bovell, which premiered at Sydney's Griffin Theatre Company. The film won seven AACTA Awards including Best Film and Best Adapted Screenplay.

Lantana is set in suburban Sydney and focuses on the complex relationships between the characters in the film. The central event of the film is the disappearance and death of a woman whose body is shown at the start of the film, but whose identity is not revealed until later. The film's name derives from the plant Lantana, an invasive species of shrub prevalent in suburban Sydney, which is attractive on the surface but a tangle of dead wood on the inside.  In the film it is a symbol of relationships, marriage in particular.  Its tangled branches are a playground and shelter for children but a trap for adults.

Plot
A woman's body is shown in lantana bushes in suburban bushland.

Leon, a policeman, and Jane have sex in a motel. They part, and Leon and his wife, Sonja, attend Latin dance classes that the recently separated Jane is also taking. Leon does not enjoy the classes.

He savagely beats a drug dealer during an arrest. He has emotional issues but refuses to confront or admit to them, while Sonja sees a therapist, Valerie, who has published a book on her daughter's recent murder. She and her husband, John, barely speak; he refers to their marriage as surviving on their grief. Valerie feels threatened by another patient, Patrick, who is having an affair (with a married man by the name of Nik), forcing her to confront her marital issues.

Jane purposely encounters Leon outside his station, and they have sex despite his reservations. Nik is upset at the relationship because he is friends with her estranged husband, Pete, who wants to return home. Jane pairs with Sonja in the next salsa class, angering Leon, who ends their arrangement, upsetting Jane. She invites Nik for coffee at Paula's behest, his wife with whom she is friendly, and offers him money as they are struggling. Paula now starts disliking Jane.

Valerie, coming home late, crashes. Stranded, she calls John, unsuccessfully. She hails a vehicle but never makes it home. Leon is the investigating detective and searches her office. Surprised at seeing his wife's file, he takes a recording of their sessions, from which he learns that Sonja would not consider an affair a betrayal, but would if Leon didn't tell her. Leon arrives home late, but Sonja is awake. He asks her about her therapy. They discuss their relationship, and he says he just ended an affair but still loves her. Sonja is upset and feels betrayed. Leon sleeps on the couch. In the morning, Sonja says that he will be lucky if she returns home that night.

Leon goes to John's house as he is the main suspect in his wife's disappearance. Leon starts discussing love, marriage and affairs, but lies to John when asked if he ever had an affair. Leon goes to Jane's house after she calls the police. Jane, late one night, saw Nik arrive home and throw something in the bushes. Later, she finds a woman's shoe there. Leon with colleague Claudia arrive and declare the shoe is Valerie's.

The police arrest Nik and he leaves his children with Jane. Police summon Paula for questioning. Neither Nik nor Paula knows that Jane called the police. Although Paula dislikes Jane, she thanks her for minding their children. The police interrogate Nik, but he refuses to answer questions about Valerie, repeatedly asking for Paula. Afterwards, Nik relaxes and talks with Leon and Paula. Valerie had car trouble and hailed Nik. He agreed to take her home but she panicked when he took a shortcut and jumped out, leaving her shoe. Paula goes to Jane's house for her children, where she tells her that Nik is innocent. Jane asks how she knows, and Paula says he told her. Jane asks if she can spend more time with the kids, but Paula forbids it after seeing how Jane went into her house and tidied it. Leon, Paula, Nik, and John go to where Valerie jumped out of the truck. They find her body, as she had fallen down a ravine. Leon listens to the rest of the therapy tape, where his wife says that she still loved him, and he cries.

Leon returns home and sees his wife outside. Jane salsa dances alone, drinking and smoking, and her husband leaves her. Patrick is pained to see his lover, the man seen in his apartment during Leon's investigation, spending time with his wife and their kids. The movie ends with Sonja and Leon dancing seductively. Leon, who found dancing with his wife difficult, now looks into Sonja's eyes and dances, just as she wanted. Sonja struggles to initially return Leon's gaze but does as the movie ends.

Cast
Anthony LaPaglia as Detective Leon Zat
Geoffrey Rush as John Knox
Barbara Hershey as Valerie Somers
Kerry Armstrong as Sonja Zat
Rachael Blake as Jane O'May
Vince Colosimo as Nik D'Amato
Russell Dykstra as Neil Toohey
Daniella Farinacci as Paula D'Amato
Peter Phelps as Patrick Phelan
Leah Purcell as Claudia Weis
Glenn Robbins as Pete O'May

Reception

Box office
Lantana opened on 15 screens in Australia in October 2001. It grossed A$604,004 in its first full week, ranking number 9 for the week. It expanded to 40 screens on 18 October. It opened on 14 December 2001 in North America in 6 theaters. In the US, it grossed $66,701 with an average of $11,116 per theater and ranking number 39 at the box office. Its widest release was 108 theaters and it ended up earning $4,623,189. The film earned $11,124,261 internationally (including $6,125,907 in Australia) for a total of $15,747,450.

Critical response
Lantana received positive reviews from critics and has a 'certified fresh' score of 90% on Rotten Tomatoes based on 106 reviews with an average rating of 7.38/10. The critical consensus states "Lantana is an intricately plotted character study that quietly shines with authenticity." The film also has a score of 84 out of 100 on Metacritic based on 29 critics indicating "universal acclaim".

Writer and critic Roger Ebert compared the film to Short Cuts and Magnolia in terms of how it developed the connections between the lives of strangers. It premiered in the UK on Channel 4 in December 2006. British critic Philip French described the film as a "thoughtful, gripping movie" based around the themes of "trust in its various forms, betrayal, forgiveness and grief".

Accolades

See also
 Cinema of Australia

References

External links
 
Lantana at the National Film and Sound Archive
Lantana at Ozmovies

ARIA Award-winning albums
2001 films
Australian drama films
Australian films based on plays
Films based on works by Australian writers
Films directed by Ray Lawrence
Films shot in Sydney
Films set in Sydney
Films scored by Paul Kelly (Australian musician)
Lionsgate films
Adultery in films
Films about grieving
Hyperlink films
2001 drama films
2000s English-language films